Tyler Kennedy (born July 15, 1986) is a Canadian-American former professional ice hockey centre who played nine seasons in the National Hockey League (NHL) for the Pittsburgh Penguins, San Jose Sharks, New York Islanders, and New Jersey Devils. He was selected by the Penguins in the fourth round, 99th overall, of the 2004 NHL Entry Draft.

Playing career

Junior and Pittsburgh Penguins

Kennedy was drafted by the Pittsburgh Penguins in the fourth round, 99th overall, of the 2004 NHL Entry Draft. After being selected, Kennedy played two seasons with the Sault Ste. Marie Greyhounds of the Ontario Hockey League (OHL). He then began playing for Pittsburgh's American Hockey League (AHL) affiliate, the Wilkes-Barre/Scranton Penguins, for the 2006–07 season. The next season, 2007–08, Kennedy then played in his first NHL game on October 27, 2007, against the Montreal Canadiens. He later scored his first career NHL goal on November 3 against the New York Islanders.

In his debut season, Kennedy was named to the NHL's YoungStars Team in 2008 alongside Penguins teammate Kris Letang. However, Kennedy was unable to compete in the game due to mononucleosis. In September 2008, just prior to the 2008–09 season, the Penguins signed Kennedy to a new contract effective through to the 2010–11 season.

In the 2009 Stanley Cup Finals against the Detroit Red Wings, Kennedy scored a goal in Game 4 of the series, also adding the game-winning goal in Game 6. The Penguins would go on to defeat Detroit in seven games to win the Stanley Cup.

Although up to this point Kennedy has had a low profile in terms of hockey fame, he attracted some notoriety when Penguins fans and ultimately the public address announcer at Mellon Arena would chant his name in the style of former World Wrestling Entertainment (WWE) wrestler Mr. Kennedy (Ken Anderson).

During the 2011 off-season, Kennedy signed a new contract with the Penguins, although his signing caused some controversy when it was reported that Pittsburgh may have deterred former Penguin legend Jaromír Jágr by signing Kennedy. Jágr later signed with the Philadelphia Flyers, Pittsburgh's state rivals. Early in the 2011–12 season with the Penguins, Kennedy was sidelined by a concussion. He finished the season with 33 points in 60 games.

San Jose Sharks
During the 2013 NHL Entry Draft, Kennedy was traded to the San Jose Sharks in exchange for a second-round draft pick. His production declined upon arriving in San Jose, scoring only 4 goals and 17 points in 67 games.

New York Islanders and New Jersey Devils
The following season, Kennedy was traded to the New York Islanders in exchange for a conditional third-round pick in the 2016 NHL Entry Draft. He finished the season appearing in 13 regular season games for the club and three games during the 2015 Stanley Cup playoffs.

In September 2015, Kennedy attended the New Jersey Devils' training camp on a professional try-out (PTO) contract; he was released after appearing in three pre-season games. Unsigned after the first quarter of the 2015–16 season played, Kennedy returned to the Devils in training with the club on another PTO contract on November 18, 2015. On November 27, Kennedy signed a one-year, two-way contract with New Jersey worth $600,000. Appearing in 50 games for the team, Kennedy scored 3 goals and 16 points.

Retirement
Kennedy announced his retirement from professional hockey on January 3, 2017. He finished his NHL career with 89 goals and 215 points in 527 games, as well as one Stanley Cup win.

Personal life
Kennedy married Brandi Engel on May 9, 2014, in Maui, Hawaii. The couple has three children. He obtained American citizenship in December 2022.

Awards
Stanley Cup champion – 2009

Career statistics

References

External links

1986 births
Living people
Canadian ice hockey centres
New Jersey Devils players
New York Islanders players
Ice hockey people from Ontario
Pittsburgh Penguins draft picks
Pittsburgh Penguins players
San Jose Sharks players
Sault Ste. Marie Greyhounds players
Sportspeople from Sault Ste. Marie, Ontario
Stanley Cup champions
Wilkes-Barre/Scranton Penguins players
Worcester Sharks players